St Joseph's College, Gregory Terrace (colloquially known as Gregory Terrace, Terrace or GT) is an independent Catholic primary and secondary day school for boys, located in Spring Hill, an inner suburb of Brisbane, Queensland, Australia. Founded on 5 July 1875 by three Irish Christian Brothers, the college follows the Edmund Rice tradition, and caters for approximately 1,665 students from Years 5 to 12.

St Joseph's College is affiliated with the Association of Heads of Independent Schools of Australia (AHISA), and is a founding member of the Great Public Schools' Association Inc (GPS). An alumnus, Hugh Lunn, wrote books about his life at St Joseph's College, Gregory Terrace.

The school was formerly affiliated with the Combined Independent Colleges (CIC).

History 
Terrace was founded in 1875 as both a day school and a boarding school. The original colours for the school were Navy Blue and White, adopted from the Congregational Crest of the Christian Brothers. In 1891 the boarding school was moved to Nudgee and in time became what is now Nudgee College, the boarding school adopted colours of Royal Blue and White. The original Gregory Terrace Navy and White rugby jersey was adopted by the Brothers Old Boys Rugby Club upon formation in 1905 and is still worn by them today. The schools both competed in the famous "Butchers' Stripes" in different shades of blue until 1923 when it was suggested by the newly appointed Gregory Terrace Headmaster, Brother Reidy that, even though the Terrace Navy Blue was close to black, one of the schools change their White to Red for easier recognition on the rugby field. At the time the Christian Brothers were changing their Motto and Crest and Brother Reidy decided to change the Terrace colours to Black and Red at the same time the crest changed.

2011 Brisbane floods 
During the January floods, St Joseph's College, Gregory Terrace had their playing fields at Tennyson, inundated with toxic waste and water from the nearby Rocklea Fruit Market.  No sports were able to be played at Tennyson during the 2011 school year and a massive refurbishment and rebuild involved the canteen and Boatshed, the iconic Grandstand was destroyed. Soil and turf were removed and completely relaid due to foul nature of the debris. During 2011 Terrace played only one home game, at Brisbane Grammar Sports ground, which was very kindly lent for the day, all other games were played at the opposing school's facilities.

Tennyson reopened in 2012 and they have completed the building of a new grandstand and player facilities.

Extra curricular activities

GPS premierships 
St Joseph's College's Queensland Great Public Schools (GPS) premierships include:

Rugby

Gregory Terrace has produced more Wallabies than any other school in Queensland and second in Australia, with 32 players having represented Australia.

Music

Percussion 
Gregory Terrace has seen major success with their percussion program over the years with one of the largest achievements, taking out the national title at the Australian Percussion Eistedfodd in 2021. Their drumline also managed to secure 2nd place in the Australian Drumline Competition in the same year, and their drumline previously had placed 3rd in 2019. They are the current reigning champions and seek to retain this position with a back-to-back win and 1st in both percussion and drumline, later this year.

QCMF 
Terrace has a rich history of receiving Gold awards across many ensembles and divisions at the Queensland Catholic Music Festival.

SHEP AHEP 
Each year Terrace also produces multiple talented musicians who participate in many honours ensemble programs both across the state and on a national scale.

House system 
There are nine houses at Terrace: Barrett, Buckley, Kearney, Magee, Mahoney, Reidy, Treacy, Windsor and Xavier. Originally six, three new houses were introduced at the beginning of the 2009 school year.

Original houses

New houses

Notable alumni

See also

List of schools in Queensland
List of Christian Brothers schools
 Catholic education in Australia

References

External links 
 
 Terrace Historical Imagery

Boys' schools in Queensland
Catholic secondary schools in Brisbane
Congregation of Christian Brothers secondary schools in Australia
Catholic boarding schools in Australia
Spring Hill, Queensland
Andrea Stombuco buildings
Educational institutions established in 1875
1875 establishments in Australia
Great Public Schools Association of Queensland
Catholic primary schools in Brisbane
Congregation of Christian Brothers primary schools in Australia